Sydney Victor Austin James (26 October 1895 – 3 August 1966) was an Australian rules footballer who played with  and  in the Victorian Football League (VFL).

Family
The eldest son of Thomas William James (1868–1938) and Rachel James (1864–1951), nee Hall, Sydney Victor Austin James was born in Glanville, South Australia on 26 October 1895.

Sydney James married Emily Eugenia Hodgson on 26 Jan 1924 at Holder Memorial Methodist Church, Mile End.

Football
James commenced his football career playing in Adelaide with the Glenelg Football Club before transferring to West Torrens.

After an injury affected season in which he made eight appearances, James accepted an offer to coach the Cananore Football Club in Tasmania in 1924.

He made only two appearances before retiring at the age of 29.

Cricket
James played one first-class cricket match for Tasmania against the touring English side in 1924/25.

Later life
Syd James lived in Melbourne until his death in August 1966 and he is buried at Box Hill Cemetery.

See also
 List of Tasmanian representative cricketers

References

External links 

 

1895 births
1966 deaths
Australian rules footballers from South Australia
Glenelg Football Club players
West Torrens Football Club players
Sydney Swans players
Cananore Football Club players
Hawthorn Football Club players
Australian cricketers
Tasmania cricketers